The 2017–18 UC Santa Barbara Gauchos men's basketball team represented the University of California, Santa Barbara during the 2017–18 NCAA Division I men's basketball season. The Gauchos, led by first-year head coach Joe Pasternack, will played their home games at the UC Santa Barbara Events Center, better known as The Thunderdome, in Santa Barbara, California, as members of the Big West Conference. They finished the season 23–9, 11–5 in Big West play to finish in a tie for second place. As the No. 2 seed in the Big West tournament, they defeated Cal Poly before losing to UC Irvine in the semifinals. Despite winning 23 games, they did not participate in a postseason tournament.

Previous season
The Gauchos finished the 2016–17 season 6–22, 4–12 in Big West play to finish in last place. As a result, they failed to quality for the Big West tournament.

Offseason

Departures

Incoming transfers

2017 incoming recruits

Roster

Schedule and results

|-
!colspan=9 style=| Exhibition

|-
!colspan=9 style=| Non-conference regular season

|-
!colspan=9 style=| Big West regular season

|-
!colspan=9 style=| Big West tournament

Source:

See also
2017–18 UC Santa Barbara Gauchos women's basketball team

References

UC Santa Barbara Gauchos men's basketball
UC Santa Barbara
UC Santa Barbara Gauchos men's basketball
UC Santa Barbara Gauchos men's basketball